Mihailo Uvalin (born 12 August 1971) is a Serbian professional basketball coach.

Coaching career 
During his career Uvalin has been a head coach for Žito Vardar, Innsbruck, Damme, Oostende, Mega Basket, Polpak Świecie, Politekhnika-Halychyna, Crvena zvezda, Stelmet Zielona Góra, Wilki Morskie Szczecin, Śląsk Wrocław, Yeşilgiresun Belediye, and HydroTruck Radom.

Career achievements and awards
As head coach
 Belgian League champion: 1 (with Telenet Oostende: 2005–06)
 Polish League champion: 1 (with Stelmet Zielona Góra: 2012–13)
 Belgian Supercup winner: 1 (with Telenet Oostende: 2006)

Individual 
PLK Best Coach (2) – 2011–12, 2012–13

See also 

 List of KK Crvena zvezda head coaches

References

External links
 Mihailo Uvalin at eurobasket.com

1971 births
Living people
BC Oostende coaches
KK Crvena zvezda head coaches
KK Crvena zvezda assistant coaches
KK Crvena zvezda youth coaches
KK Mega Basket coaches
Polpak Świecie coaches
Serbian men's basketball coaches
Serbian expatriate basketball people in Austria
Serbian expatriate basketball people in Belgium
Serbian expatriate basketball people in North Macedonia
Serbian expatriate basketball people in Poland
Serbian expatriate basketball people in Turkey
Serbian expatriate basketball people in Ukraine